VIVO D N Nagar, is a metro station on Line 1 of the Mumbai Metro serving the D.N. Nagar neighbourhood of Andheri in Mumbai, India. It was opened to the public on 8 June 2014. The station is located at Indian Oil Junction.

This station will connect Line 2 of Mumbai Metro.

History

Station layout

Facilities

List of available ATM at Vivo D N Nagar metro station are

Connections
The station is an interchange station between Lines 1 and 2 of the Metro that runs from Dahisar East to Mandala

Exits

See also
Public transport in Mumbai
List of Mumbai Metro stations
List of rapid transit systems in India
List of Metro Systems

References

External links

The official site of Mumbai Metro
 UrbanRail.Net – descriptions of all metro systems in the world, each with a schematic map showing all stations.

Mumbai Metro stations
Railway stations in India opened in 2014
2014 establishments in Maharashtra